The 1998–99 Winston YUBA League was the 7th season of the YUBA League, the top-tier professional basketball league in Yugoslavia (later renamed to Serbia and Montenegro).

Teams 
A total of 12 teams participated in the 1998–99 Winston YUBA League.

Distribution
The following is the access list for this season.

Promotion and relegation 
 Teams promoted from the YUBA B League
 Hemofarm
 Zdravlje

 Teams relegated to the YUBA B League
OKK Beograd
Borovica
Vojvodina
Mornar

Venues and locations

Personnel and sponsorship

Regular season

Standings

Playoffs 
The playoffs were not played due to the NATO bombing of Yugoslavia (March–June 1999) and then top-seeded Budućnost was awarded with the championships title.

Clubs in European competitions

See also 
 1998–99 ACB season
 1998–99 Slovenian Basketball League

References

1998–99 in Yugoslav basketball
Serbia